Boundji Airport  is an airport serving the city of Boundji in Cuvette Department, Republic of the Congo. The runway is on the western edge of the city, and has an additional  of cleared, unpaved overrun on its western end.

See also

 List of airports in the Republic of the Congo
 Transport in the Republic of the Congo

References

External links
OpenStreetMap - Boundji
OurAirports - Boundji

Airports in the Republic of the Congo
Cuvette Department